The Association of the United States Army (AUSA) is a private, non-profit organization that serves as the professional association of the United States Army. Founded in 1950, it has 121 chapters worldwide. Membership is open to everyone, not just Army personnel, nor is membership mandatory for soldiers. The organization publishes ARMY Magazine and the Green Book. The current president is retired Army General Robert Brooks Brown.

Membership
Membership in AUSA is open to all Army ranks and all components are represented--including Regular Army, National Guard, Army Reserve, Government Civilians, Retirees, Wounded Warriors, Veterans, concerned citizens and family members. AUSA welcomes anyone who subscribes to the philosophy of a strong national defense with special concern for the Army. Community businesses and defense industry companies are also vital and contributing members of AUSA.   Other membership categories include Community Partners and National Partners (for defense industry businesses).  Membership in AUSA includes a subscription to ARMY Magazine received monthly, including the Green Book, which is published in October of each year.  The Green Book is an almanac of articles from Army leadership and reference information about America's Army worldwide.  Members also receive AUSA Extra a weekly digital newspaper featuring the latest news about the Army and the association.

Chapters
AUSA has 121 chapters worldwide, which develop programs and activities that provide community support for the US Army through individual and corporate members. Chapters serve as the liaison between the Army and local civilian communities. They also help educate the public about the needs for a strong national defense and the Army.  Chapters are involved in a variety of programs to help support deployed and mobilized soldiers and their families. Typical chapter activities include general membership meetings with high-profile guest speakers, community involvement events and special events honoring the Army and outstanding soldiers.

Awards
The Association of the United States Army presents a number of distinguished soldiers, civil servants, and volunteers with national awards at its Annual Meeting.  In addition, local chapters also give a variety of awards to local soldiers, Army civilians, and volunteers, as well as managing scholarships programs benefiting local students and soldiers.

General George Catlett Marshall Medal
Established in 1960, the George Catlett Marshall Medal is AUSA's highest honor, and is awarded annually for selfless service to the United States of America.  Past recipients include Colin Powell, Madeleine Albright, Kenneth Fisher, and George H. W. Bush.

General Creighton W. Abrams Medal
Established in 1965, the General Creighton W. Abrams Medal is awarded annually to the individual or group who has done the most to foster the advancement of the United States Army during the past year.  Past recipients include Daniel Inouye, William E. DePuy, and the Arlington Ladies.

Major General Anthony J. Drexel Biddle Medal
The Major General Anthony J. Drexel Biddle Medal is awarded annually to the individual who has contributed most significantly to AUSA's mission over the previous year, often honoring AUSA's most diligent volunteers.  Past recipients include Julius W. Becton Jr., Paik Sun-yup, and William G. Bainbridge.

Sergeant Major of the Army William G. Bainbridge Medal
Established in 2000, the Sergeant Major of the Army William G. Bainbridge Medal is awarded annually to the noncommissioned officer contributing most to the United States Army Noncommissioned Officer Corps.  Past recipients include SGM David G. Martinez, CSM Andrew McFowler, and Richard A. Kidd.

John W. Dixon Award
The John W. Dixon Award, established in 1989, is presented annually for distinguished service in the industrial community resulting in outstanding contributions to national defense.  Past recipients include Linda Hudson, Marillyn Hewson, and Norman R. Augustine.

Major General James Earl Rudder Medal 
The Major General James Early Rudder Medal given to a current or former member of the U.S. Army Reserve for advancing a seamless and component-integrated Army.  Past recipients include Jeffrey W. Talley, Jack C. Stultz, and Marcia Anderson.

Lieutenant General Raymond S. McClain Medal 
The Lieutenant General Raymond S. McLain Medal given to a current or former member of the National Guard for advancing a seamless and component-integrated Army. Past recipients include Roger C. Schultz, Gus Hargett, Ansel M. Stroud, and Raymond F. Rees.

See also
 Air & Space Forces Association
 Space Force Association
 Marine Corps Association
 United States Naval Institute
 Coast Guard Foundation

References

External links

 Official site

Non-profit organizations based in Arlington, Virginia
Organizations established in 1950
United States Army associations